Chris Van Hoof is a full professor at KU Leuven’s Faculty of Engineering Science, Vice-President Connected Health Solutions and Fellow at IMEC, and general manager of OnePlanet Research Center.

Van Hoof has published over 600 papers in journals and conference proceedings and has given over 100 invited talks. His research has resulted in five startups, of which four are healthcare-related.

Education

In 1992, Van Hoof received his PhD in Electrical Engineering from the University of Leuven in collaboration with IMEC.

OnePlanet Research Center

Van Hoof is general manager of OnePlanet Research Center. In February 2019, the Dutch government provided a 65 million euro grant to create the research venture, which is a multidisciplinary collaboration agreement between IMEC, Wageningen University & Research, Radboud University, and Radboud University Medical Center.

At OnePlanet, Van Hoof oversees fundamental and applied research and aims to use the latest chip and digital technologies to create novel health and agriculture technology-based solutions.  Agrifood and health scientists are developing technologies to help people eat and live healthier, while ensuring a sustainable supply chain.

IMEC

At IMEC, Van Hoof oversees all research that goes into wearables, smart sensors and other connected health-related technology, such as ingestible and invisible body monitoring technologies. Van Hoof previously held positions at IMEC as manager and director leading research on sensors, imagers, 3D integration, MEMS, energy harvesting, body area networks, biomedical electronics, and wearable health.  Van Hoof’s research at IMEC has been published in leading scientific journals, such as Nature.

Digital Twin Technology

Van Hoof is applying digital twin technology to build a more complete picture of an individual’s lifestyle, behavior and environment, with the aim of preventing and intercepting diseases that currently rely on longitudinal recordings.  In January 2019, Van Hoof stated that mental health therapy in particular is based on a trial and error approach, which can stall the recovery process dramatically, and believes it could enable therapists to personalize the treatment of mental health disorders faster and more effectively.

EEG Headset

In 2018, IMEC announced that Van Hoof and his team had developed a prototype of an electroencephalogram (EEG) headset that can measure emotions and cognitive processes in the brain.

IMEC stated that while traditional EEG technologies have been around for a long time to diagnose medical conditions like epilepsy or sleep disorders, they fall short for promising novel therapeutic applications, such as cognitive skill improvement through sensory stimulation and VR-based cognitive treatments for conditions such as autism and ADHD. IMEC’s wireless EEG headset allows users to comfortably wear the device for hours on end  which makes it suitable for therapeutic, learning and gaming applications.

Health Patch

In 2016, Van Hoof and his team at IMEC presented a small-form health patch that was reported to have more functionalities than any other patch available on the market. The chip was optimized for low power consumption and was combined with an electrode patch that can stay on the body for long periods of time, including when showering.

Van Hoof’s technology was the first patch to combine a variety of sensing capabilities – ranging from an accelerometer (to track a person’s physical activity) to ECG tracking (measuring the heart’s electrical activity) and bioelectrical impedance monitoring (measuring body composition, respiratory activity and the distribution of body fluids).

References 

Old University of Leuven alumni
Dutch electrical engineers
Academic staff of KU Leuven
Dutch male writers
21st-century Dutch engineers
Living people
Year of birth missing (living people)